This is a complete list in alphabetical order of cricketers who have played for Essex County Cricket Club in top-class matches since 1894 when the team was elevated to first-class status before the club joined the County Championship in 1895. Essex has been classified as a List A team since the beginning of limited overs cricket in 1963 and as a top-level Twenty20 team since the inauguration of the Twenty20 Cup in 2003.

The details are the player's usual name followed by the years in which he was active as an Essex player and then his name is given as it would appear on modern match scorecards. Note that many players represented other first-class teams besides Essex and that some played for the club in minor cricket before 1894. Current players are shown as active to the latest season in which they played for the club. The list excludes Second XI and other players who did not play for the club's first team and players whose first team appearances were in minor matches only.

A

B

C

D

E

F

G

H

I
 Mark Ilott (1988–2002) : M. C. Ilott
 John Inns (1898–1904) : J. H. Inns
 Doug Insole (1947–1969) : D. J. Insole
 Ronnie Irani (1994–2007) : R. C. Irani
 Lee Irvine (1968–1969) : B. L. Irvine

J
 Jahid Ahmed (2005–2009) : Jahid Ahmed
 Victor Jarvis (1925) : V. E. Jarvis
 Will Jefferson (2000–2006) : W. I. Jefferson
 Cecil Jenkinson (1922–1923) : C. V. Jenkinson
 Lindsey Jerman (1950–1951) : L. C. S. Jerman
 Arthur Johnston (1889–1896) : A. S. Johnston
 Tony Jorden (1966–1970) : A. M. Jorden
 Ronald Joy (1922–1928) : R. C. G. Joy

K

L

M

N

O
 Jack O'Connor (1921–1939) : J. O'Connor
 Charles Orman (1896) : C. E. L. Orman
 Max Osborne (2009–2011) : M. Osborne
 Hugh Owen (1880–1902) : H. G. P. Owen

P

Q
 Arnold Quick (1936–1952) : A. B. Quick
 Stan Quin (1924) : S. E. V. Quin
 Rob Quiney (2013) : R. J. Quiney
 Matt Quinn (2016–2020) : M. R. Quinn

R

S

T

U
 Frederick Unwin (1932–1950) : F. S. Unwin
 Jim Unwin (1932–1939) : E. J. Unwin

V
 James Valiant (1912) : J. Valiant
 Henry van Straubenzee (1938) : H. H. van Straubenzee
 Kishen Velani (2012–2016) : K. S. Velani
 Nicholas Vere-Hodge (1936–1939) : N. Vere-Hodge
 Frank Vigar (1938–1954) : F. H. Vigar
 Murali Vijay (2018) : M. Vijay

W

Y
 Sailor Young (1898–1912) : H. I. Young

Z
 Adam Zampa (2018–2019) : A. Zampa

See also
 List of Essex cricket captains

Notes

References

Essex
 
Essex County Cricket Club
Cricket